Marina Orschel (born July 14, 1937) is a former beauty queen and actress. In 1956 she won Miss Germany and was 1st runner-up in the Miss Universe contest. At first her measurements were announced as 36-22-34 inches (91-56-86 cm), but she handed a measuring tape to Miss England and corrected them to 40-27-34 inches (102–69–86 cm). Following these successes, she, Ingrid Goude, and Carol Morris were offered contracts by Universal Pictures, though Orschel's screen appearances are mainly in German films.

Selected filmography 
 Das Sonntagskind (1956)
 The Tattered Dress (1957)
 Träume von der Südsee (1957)
 Heute blau und morgen blau (1957)
 Rivalen der Manege (1958)
 The Csardas King (1958)

References

Bibliography 
 Richard Koper. Fifties Blondes: Sexbombs, Sirens, Bad Girls and Teen Queens. 2010.
 Bob Larkins & Boyd Magers. The Films of Audie Murphy. McFarland, 2016.

External links 
 

1937 births
Living people
German film actresses
Models from Berlin
Miss Universe 1956 contestants
German beauty pageant winners
Actresses from Berlin